Among the many systems of classification of crops, commercial, agricultural, and taxonomical can be considered to be the most widely accepted agriculture classification of crops.

Commercial classification 

Plants are classified according to commercial purposes as food crops, industrial crops, and food adjuncts.

Food crops: cereals, rice, wheat, maize, sorghum, ragi, pulses, legumes, fruits, vegetables, and nuts.

Industrial crops: cotton, sugarcane, tobacco, groundnut, castor, gingelly, tapioca, etc.

Food adjuncts: food and industrial use, no distinct demarcation; spices, condiments, beverages, and narcotics.

It is also possible that one crop which has been included as a food crop may be figured as an industrial crop; for example maize or tapioca.

Agricultural classification

Plants and plant products for human use.

Cereals
Legumes
Vegetables
Fruits
Nuts
Oilseeds
Sugars and Starches
Fibres
Beverages
Narcotics
Spices
Condiments
Rubber
Forage
Green manure and green leaf manure

Cereals 

Ceres - the Roman Goddess of harvest

Wheat and barley were generally the offerings - called Cerealia munera

Subsequently, the grains used for food, especially for making bread were called Cerealia or cereals

Applicable to the grains obtained from the members of the family Poaceae.

E.g. Rice, wheat, maize, sorghum, ragi, barley, pearl millet, fox-tail millet, rye, oats, etc.

Millets - number of small grained cereals which are of minor importance as food.

Pseudo-cereals - plants other than those of Poaceae

E.g. Buckwheat (Fagopyrum spp. - Chenopodiaceae), Grain amaranths (Amaranthus spp. - Amaranthaceae), Quina (Chenopodium quinoa - Chenopodiaceae)

Pulses 

Important source of human food - next to the cereals. The term pulse is used for the seeds of leguminous plants.

Pulses supply proteins and form chief source in vegetarian food. Leguminous plants fix nitrogen in root nodules - produced with the help of nitrogen fixing bacteria.

Seeds, pods, leaves and the shoots also contain a high proportion of protein e.g. Red gram, black gram, green gram.

Oils and oilseeds 

Important both for consumption and industrial purposes.

In the human diet, the fat portion is supplied by oils, which give the necessary energy for metabolism, besides adding taste to the food.

Medicinal Value

Industrial uses: preparation of soaps, cosmetics and lubrication

Pastures 

The grasses and legumes which are grown in arable land and left for animals to graze-on.

The straw of paddy and cholam and dry plants of pulse crops and groundnut form important forages.

The foliage of a number of trees and shrubs which are edible to animals form another source of forage especially in dry areas and during the periods of scarcity.

Sugars and starches 

Sugar is extracted from sugarcane. It contains sugar content in the bark similarly it is extracted from sugar beet and palm.

Starch can be extracted from, e.g., cassava or tapioca.

Spices and condiments

Fibers

Rubbers 

There are trees found in most parts of the world but mostly Africa that make or provide rubber for human uses.

Green manures and green-leaf manures 

Growing of special crops for adding organic matter and nitrogen to the soil and by ploughing them in situ is called green manuring.

Sunhemp 
Pillipesara 
Kolingi
Indigo 
Sesbania speciosa

Taxonomical classification 

Taxonomical classification includes the taxonomical aspects of crops which is their morphology and economical parts and agro-botanical characters.

As an advantage this classification increases understanding of the morphological characters of any particular family.

As a disadvantage of this classification crops with different economic uses and morphological and other agro-botanical peculiarities when brought under one family do not generally bring out the economic importance of the individual crops.

References 

1. Botany of Tropical Crops - Dr. V. Chellamuthu
2. Economic Botany by Kochhar

Crops